The European Electronic Crime Task Force (EECTF) is an information sharing initiative, created in 2009 by an agreement between the United States Secret Service, the Italian Ministry of Internal Affairs and Poste Italiane. The EECTF's mission is "to support the analysis and the development of best practices against cybercrime in European countries, through the creation of a strategic alliance between public and private sectors, including Law Enforcement, the financial sector, academia, international institutions, and ICT security vendors".

Accordingly, the EECTF aims to help the cyber security community by:
 Strengthening relationships between the different players;
 Training and supporting members through sharing expertise and knowledge;
 Enabling an effective communication channel for information exchange;
 Maintaining co-operation on a technical and operational level.

History

The EECTF was established on June 30, 2009, by an agreement between the United States Secret Service, the Italian Ministry of Internal Affairs and Poste Italiane, on the basis of the successful experiences of analogous ECTFs founded in the US by the Secret Service.

The United States Secret Service participates through its Rome office, the Italian Ministry of Interior participates through the Service of Postal and Telecommunications Police and Poste Italiane participates through the Information Security Department.

Initially restricted only to the only Founder Members, the EECTF was opened up thereafter to the main stakeholders in cybercrime, who expressed the will to contribute to a proactive sharing of relevant information. A Permanent Members Group has been started, which gathers to analyze emerging trends in cyber-crime and to discuss methodologies and techniques to combat them.

Governance

The EECTF is not a legal entity, it is a working group created on a voluntary basis, which has been governed since its creation by the EECTF Board made up of the three Founder Members: the United States Secret Service, represented by the special agent in charge of the Rome office, the Polizia Postale e delle Comunicazioni, represented by the head of service and Poste Italiane, represented by the CEO.
Poste Italiane has chaired the EECTF Board since its inception. The chairman of the EECTF is Mr. Vanes Montanari, VP Security and Safety at Poste Italiane.

Administrative and operational activities are accomplished by the EECTF Technical Secretariat, held by Poste Italiane.

Modus operandi

The EECTF is run via monthly meetings of a select group of permanent members, quarterly open events extended to a wide community of selected experts and continuous sharing of information relevant to cybercrime and through dedicated specific tools.

Permanent members include internationally acknowledged organizations, both private and public, with a broad view on prevention, analysis and contrast of electronic crimes at European level, whose competencies might represent instances coming from whole domains of interest.

Permanent Members formally commit to proactively share information with other members of the group in a non-competitive environment, according to a non-disclosure agreement, and to actively contribute to the EECTF's activities, taking part to meetings and supporting the EECTF's development.

Additionally, in order to make the most out of the competencies of the whole EECTF community, an Expert Group has been started, which gathers on a periodic basis and is restricted to Permanent Members. It focuses on technical information sharing about new threats and possible countermeasures.

Constituency

The EECTF is made up of the following organizations:

EECTF Community and Plenary Meetings

With the aim of aggregating all the potentially valuable stakeholders, an invitation-only Community of Experts has been set up as a public interface of the Permanent Members Group. It is made up of acknowledged professionals and organizations who are distinguished as active contributors in the field of prevention and contrast of electronic crime.
The EECTF gathers in periodic plenary meetings, organized to focus on general trends in cybercrime and security issues of current interest. More than 10 Plenary Meetings have been organized so far, as listed below.

Past speakers include:
 APWG - AntiPhishing Working Group
 CERT-EU
 ENISA - European Union Agency for Network and Information Security
 European Commission
 European Payments Council
 Europol
 Italian Data Protection Authority
 Italian Ministry of Economy and Finance
 Italian Ministry of Internal Affairs
 UNICRI - United Nations Interregional Crime and Justice Research Institute
 United States Secret Service
 US Ambassador to Italy

Additionally, a monthly newsletter, CyberNews, is published within the community, to point out the most relevant events and trends in the cybercrime scenario.

See also
United States Secret Service
USSS Electronic Crimes Task Forces - Rome 
Poste italiane
Polizia Postale e delle Comunicazioni - Polizia di Stato

External links
 Sandia National Laboratories, Assessment of Current Cybersecurity Practices in the Public Domain: Cyber Indications and Warnings Domain, September 2010
 UNICRI, Impact of Cybercrime on business and Economy, November 2013

References

Agreements
Bodies of the Common Security and Defence Policy
Collaboration
Crime prevention
Information technology organizations based in Europe
Public–private partnership
Security organizations
Task Forces
Working groups